The Palamau Tiger Reserve is one of the nine original tiger reserves in Jharkhand, India and the only one in this state. It forms part of Betla National Park and Palamau Wildlife Sanctuary.
As of 2022, the reserve is reported to be largely under Naxal control.

Formation 
The area in Latehar District in Jharkhand was set aside as protected in 1974 under the Indian Forests Act. Before the formation of the reserve, the area was used for cattle grazing and camping; it was acutely prone to forest fire. In 1973, the area was set up as the Palamu Tiger Reserve.

Area 

Ramandag, Latoo and Kujurum forest villages are in the core area. Most of the villages are small; one village, Meral, consisted in 1993 of just  of land, 9 families and 78 people. In 1993 there were 45 villages in the buffer area and about 60 more in the periphery of the reserve.

, that number had grown to 136 villages that fall under the "buffer area" regulations of the Palamu Tiger Reserve. Only seven of the villages were in existence in 1923. The villagers have no legal claim to lands that were settled after 1973 when the buffer area for the reserve was created.

Wildlife 
The tiger population is extremely scarce and counting them has become particularly difficult due to Naxalite activities that have increased since 1990. , the count, using DNA to prevent over-counting, is one male and five female tigers. 

The initial count in 1973 when the tiger reserve was created was 50 tigers, but some claim that this was an over-count without adequate controls. By 2005 the number of tigers was down to 38. The census in 2007 found only 17 tigers. The 2009 tiger census based on DNA analysis indicated that there were just six tigers in the reserve. The forest department claimed that, since the core area was almost inaccessible due to difficult terrain and the Naxalite presence, the census may not have found all the tigers. No new tigers have found till 2012 and decreased game and hunting opportunities suggest that these are the only six. In 2017, a tiger was spotted by tourist. In 2018, All India Tiger count recorded no tiger in reserve. In 2021, a tiger was spotted in camera trap and footprints of tigress was found.

As of 1989, 65 elephants were believed to reside in the reserve.

Apart from tigers and elephants, leopards, gaurs, sambars and wild dogs live in the reserve.

Over 140 species of birds (including peafowl) have been sighted in the reserve.

Two white vultures were spotted by the officials of Palamu Tiger Reserve in Chainpur in 2013. They were seen on the sand bed of River North Koel, said sources. This is the first time in 10 years that a vulture has been sighted in Palamu.

Issues
Increased pressure from human activities, including illegal settlement and poaching, has reduced the number of tigers and the ability of the reserve to support more tigers.
Funding has been a continuing problem. Since there is not an adequate management plan for the reserve, it continues to be so.
Staff shortage is big problem. Monitoring, protection and conservation work is not applied in all region of this reserve.
Naxalites existence along with difficult terrain makes proper surveillance and implementation of conservation measures tough.

See also
Palamu district
Palamu Fort

References

External links
 Project Tiger homepage for Palamu Tiger Reserve

Chota Nagpur dry deciduous forests
Tiger reserves of India
Tourist attractions in Jharkhand
Wildlife sanctuaries in Jharkhand
Protected areas established in 1973
1973 establishments in Bihar